The 2015–16 Sultan Qaboos Cup is the 43rd edition of the Sultan Qaboos Cup, the premier knockout tournament for football teams in Oman.

The competition began on 23 October 2015 with the Qualification round. Al-Oruba SC were the defending champions, having won their fourth title in 2015. On Saturday 30 April 2016, Saham Club overcame Al-Khaboura SC with a solitary goal victory and to lay their hands on the prestigious Sultan Qaboos Cup trophy only for the second time in the club's history.

Teams
This year the tournament had 38 teams.

 Ahli Sidab Club (Sidab)
 Al-Bashaer Club 
 Al-Hamra SC (Al-Hamra)
 Al-Ittifaq Club
 Al-Ittihad Club (Salalah)
 Al-Kamel Wa Al-Wafi SC 
 Al-Khabourah SC (Al-Khabourah)
 Al-Mudhaibi Club (Mudhaibi)
 Al-Musannah SC (Al-Musannah)
 Al-Nahda Club (Al-Buraimi)
 Al-Nasr S.C.S.C. (Salalah)
 Al-Oruba SC (Sur)
 Al-Rustaq SC (Rustaq)
 Al-Salam SC (Sohar)
 Al-Seeb Club (Al-Seeb)
 Al-Shabab Club (Seeb)
 Al-Suwaiq Club (Suwaiq
 Al-Tali'aa SC (Sur)
 Al-Wahda SC (Sur)
 Bahla Club (Bahla)
 Bidia SC (Bidiya)
 Bowsher Club (Bowsher)
 Dhofar S.C.S.C. (Salalah)
 Dibba Club (Dibba Al-Baya)
 Fanja SC (Fanja)
 Ibri Club (Ibri)
 Ja'lan SC (Jalan Bani Bu Ali)
 Khasab SC (Khasab)
 Madha SC  (Madha)
 Masirah SC (Majees)
 Majees SC (Majees)
 Mirbat SC (Mirbat)
 Muscat Club (Muscat)
 Nizwa Club (Nizwa)
 Oman Club (Muscat)
 Quriyat Club (Quriyat)
 Saham SC (Saham)
 Salalah SC (Salalah)
 Samail SC (Samail)
 Sohar SC (Sohar)
 Sur SC (Sur)
 Yanqul SC (Yanqul)

Qualification round
3 teams played a knockout tie. 3 ties were played over one leg. The first match was played between Al-Wusta Club and Dibba Club on 23 October 2015. Dibba Club, Al-Salam SC and Bidia SC advanced to the Round of 32 after winning their respective ties.

Round of 32
The draw for the round of 32 was held on 9 December 2015. 32 teams played a knockout tie. 16 ties were played over one leg. 16 teams advanced to the Round of 16. The first match was played between Ahli Sidab Club and Al-Shabab Club on 29 December 2015 at the Al-Seeb Stadium, Al-Seeb.

Round of 16
The draw for the round of 16 was held on 4 January 2016. 16 teams played a knockout tie. 8 ties were played over one leg. 8 teams advanced to the Quarter-finals. The first match was played between Oman Club and Fanja SC on 13 January 2016 at the Al-Seeb Stadium, Al-Seeb.

Quarter-finals
The draw for the Quarter-finals was held on 25 January 2016. 8 teams played knockout ties. 4 ties were played over two legs. The first match was played between Al-Nasr S.C.S.C. and Fanja SC on 15 February 2016 at the Salalah Sports Complex, Salalah. Al-Nasr S.C.S.C., Al-Khabourah SC, Salalah SC and Saham Club advanced to the Semi-finals.

First leg

Second leg

Semi-finals
The draw for the Semi-finals was held on 2 March 2016. 4 teams played knockout ties. 2 ties were played over two legs. Saham Club and Al-Khaboura SC advanced to the Finals, with the latter making its first ever Sultan Qaboos Cup finals in the history of the club.

First leg

Second leg

Finals
The Finals of the 2015–16 Sultan Qaboos Cup was played between Al-Khabourah SC and Saham Club, both from the Al-Batinah on 30 April 2016 at the Sohar Regional Sports Complex, Sohar under the auspices of His Excellency Hassan Al-Shuraiqi, Inspector General of Police and Customs.

See also
2015–16 Oman Professional League
2015–16 Oman Professional League Cup
2015–16 Oman First Division League

References

External links
Oman Sultan Cup 2015-2016 - Goalzz.com

Sultan Qaboos Cup seasons
Cup
Oman